General Hospital is the longest running American television serial drama, airing on ABC. Created by Frank and Doris Hursley, the series premiered on April 1, 1963. Former cast member Rachel Ames was previously the series' longest-running cast member, portraying Audrey Hardy from 1964 to 2007, and making guest appearances in 2009 and 2013, the latter for the series' fiftieth anniversary. Ames made a special appearance on October 30, 2015. Anthony Geary, who has portrayed Luke Spencer, was the fourth longest-running cast member, having joined General Hospital in November 1978. Geary made his last appearance on May 4, 2017. This is a list of previous cast members.

Previous cast members

See also
 General Hospital
 General Hospital cast members
 List of General Hospital characters

References

External links
SoapCentral.com GH "Comings and Goings"
IMDb.com "Full Cast and Crew for General Hospital"

General Hospital
General Hospital